Labastide is a commune in the Hautes-Pyrénées department in the Occitania region in Southwestern France. In 2019, it had a population of 154.

See also
Communes of the Hautes-Pyrénées department

References

Communes of Hautes-Pyrénées